Kudat Division is an administrative division in the state of Sabah, Malaysia. It occupies the northern tip of Sabah. Its total area of 4,623 square kilometres (6.3% of Sabah's total territory) makes it the smallest of the five divisions of Sabah. The division covers the districts of Kudat, Pitas and Kota Marudu, as well as the islands of Balak, Balambangan, Banggi, Bankawan, Guhuan Utara (North Guhuan), Kalampunian and Malawali.

As of 2010, the division had 186,516 inhabitants, making up approximately 6% of Sabah's total population. It is mostly inhabited by the Rungus people. Kudat is the largest town and main transport hub within the division. Commodities are transported to the division via the town's port, and its airport is the only one in the division.

Districts 
Kudat Division is subdivided into the following administrative districts:
 Kota Marudu District (1,917 km2) (Kota Marudu Town)
 Kudat District (1,287 km2) (Kudat Town)
 Pitas District (1,419 km2) (Pitas Town)

Member of Parliament (Dewan Rakyat)

History 
The present divisions of Sabah is largely inherited from the division of the North Borneo Chartered Company. Following the acquisition of North Borneo under the royal charter issued in 1881, the administrative division introduced by Baron von Overbeck was continued by the establishment of two residences comprising West Coast Residency and East Coast Residency. Seat of the two residents was in Sandakan, where the governor was based. Each resident, in turn, was divided into several provinces managed by a district officer.

As North Borneo progresses, the number of residencies has increased to five including: Tawau Residency (also known as East Coast Residency), Sandakan Residency, West Coast Residency, Kudat Residency, and Interior Residency; the provinces were initially named after the members of the board: Alcock, Cunlife, Dewhurst, Keppel, Dent, Martin, Elphinstone, Myburgh and Mayne. The senior residents occupied Sandakan and the West Coast, while the other three resident with the second class residencies occupied Interior, East Coast and Kudat. The residents of Sandakan and West Coast were members of the Legislative Council, the Legislative Assembly of the Company.

The division into residencies was maintained when North Borneo became a Crown Colony after World War II. On 16 September 1963, with the formation of Malaysia, North Borneo which subsequently became the state of Sabah took over the administrative structure through the Ordinance on Administrative Units. At the same time, the Yang di-Pertua Negeri, the head of state of Sabah, was authorised by proclamation to divide the state into divisions and districts. The abolition of the residency term was in favour of the division term that took place in 1976.

Today, the division has only formal significance and no longer constitutes its own administrative level. The resident's post was also abolished, as Sabah's municipal administration is in the hands of the district officers.

See also 
 Divisions of Malaysia

Notes

Literature

References

Further reading 
 State of Sabah: Administrative Divisions Ordinance – Sabah Cap. 167 (PDF) of 1 November 1954; last amended on 16 September 1963, as amended in August 2010; Accessed on 3 November 2017